Duffy may refer to:

People
Duffy (surname), people with the surname Duffy or Duffey
Duffy (nickname)
Duffy (singer) (born 1984), Welsh singer, born Aimee Ann Duffy

Places
Duffy, Australian Capital Territory, a suburb of Canberra
Duffy, Ohio, United States, an unincorporated community
Duffy, West Virginia, United States, an unincorporated community
Duffy Fairgrounds, a stadium in New York, United States
Duffy's Hill, a hill in Manhattan, New York
Duffy's Peak, a hill or butte in Texas, United States
Duffy Peak, a mountain on Alexander Island, Antarctica

Arts and entertainment
Duffy the Disney Bear, an anthropomorphic teddy bear character featured at Disney theme parks
Duffy (film), a 1968 comedy starring James Coburn
Duffy (novel), a 1980 novel by Julian Barnes writing as Dan Kavanagh
Tristan Duffy, a fictional character in American Horror Story

Other uses
USS Duffy (DE-27), a US Navy destroyer

See also
Duffy antigen system, a type of cell marker proteins and the gene which codes for them
Duffy site, an archaeological site in Illinois, United States
Duffy Square, part of Times Square in New York City, United States
Duffy & Snellgrove, an Australian book publishing company
Duffie, a surname
O'Duffy, a surname
Dufy (disambiguation), a surname